Empty is a cult Australian "creative" magazine, concerned largely with printed design work, photography, illustration and film, created for the professional creative community.

The magazine is published by Sydney-based Design is Kinky studio, curators of the Semi-Permanent design festival, a fixture in design culture's global landscape, which occurs annually in Australia.

The magazine acts largely as a gallery of artwork, both domestic and international. It also features cultural commentary and interviews with artists, animators, other magazines, and so on. Notable interviewees have included Mark Andrews, head of story on The Incredibles (cover story, issue 2, late 2004), and Dan Houser of Rockstar Games (issue 3, early-2005).

Empty was launched in April 2004 and is published somewhat arbitrarily, but usually bimonthly.  It features little to no advertising.

The current editor is Andrew Johnstone, creator of Empty and the above-mentioned Design is Kinky and Semi-Permanent.

The magazine enjoys newsstand distribution, but at this time is distributed only within Australia.

Staff 
Editor Andrew Johnstone
Art Direction Design is Kinky Studio

External links 

Design is Kinky website

2004 establishments in Australia
Film magazines published in Australia
Cultural magazines
Design magazines
Magazines established in 2004